The 2021 NASCAR Cup Series Championship Race was a NASCAR Cup Series race held on November 7, 2021 at Phoenix Raceway in Avondale, Arizona. Contested over 312 laps on the one mile (1.6 km) oval, it was the 36th and final race of the 2021 NASCAR Cup Series season, and was also the last race for the Generation 6 car body, as it was replaced in 2022 by the Next Gen Car. Kyle Larson won the race and claimed his first NASCAR Cup Series Championship.

Report

Background

Phoenix Raceway – also known as PIR – is a one-mile, low-banked tri-oval race track located in Avondale, Arizona. It is named after the nearby metropolitan area of Phoenix. The motorsport track opened in 1964 and currently hosts two NASCAR race weekends annually. PIR has also hosted the IndyCar Series, CART, USAC and the Rolex Sports Car Series. The raceway is currently owned and operated by International Speedway Corporation.

The raceway was originally constructed with a  road course that ran both inside and outside of the main tri-oval. In 1991 the track was reconfigured with the current  interior layout. PIR has an estimated grandstand seating capacity of around 67,000. Lights were installed around the track in 2004 following the addition of a second annual NASCAR race weekend.

Phoenix Raceway is home to two annual NASCAR race weekends, one of 13 facilities on the NASCAR schedule to host more than one race weekend a year. The track is both the first and last stop in the western United States, as well as the fourth and the last track on the schedule.

Championship drivers
Kyle Larson was the first of the four drivers to clinch a spot in the Championship 4, winning the first race of the Round of 8 at Texas. Chase Elliott, Martin Truex Jr., and Denny Hamlin clinched the remaining three spots based on points.

Entry list
 (R) denotes rookie driver.
 (i) denotes driver who are ineligible for series driver points.
 (CC) denotes championship contender.

Practice

Practice results

Qualifying

Qualifying results

Race
Note: Kyle Larson, Martin Truex Jr., Denny Hamlin, and Chase Elliott are not eligible for stage points because of their participation in the Championship 4.

Kyle Larson won the pole position for the race. The majority of the race saw the Championship 4 drivers in the front, with Martin Truex Jr. winning Stage 1 and Larson winning Stage 2. With 60 laps to go, Truex made a pit stop as rookie Anthony Alfredo wrecked, but Truex was able to exit pit road on the lead lap before the caution came out. Truex took the lead when the other Championship 4 drivers pitted during caution. Truex was leading the race with 30 laps to go when the caution came out for the wrecked David Starr. In the final pit stop of the season, Hamlin's pit crew conducted a 12.1 second pit stop that would have allowed Hamlin to exit pit road with the lead. But with Larson in the first pit stall and Larson's pit crew conducting a 11.8 second pit stop (the second fastest time for the crew in the season), Larson was able to exit pit road with the lead. When green flag racing resumed with 24 laps to go, Larson got a good jump to clear the other drivers, but Truex was able to follow close behind. Despite some close challenges from Truex in the final laps, Larson held on to win his tenth race of the season and his first career NASCAR Cup Championship. Truex Jr., Hamlin and Elliott would finish 2nd, 3rd and 5th respectively in the race to finish in the point standings 2nd, 3rd and 4th respectively.

Stage Results

Stage One
Laps: 75

Stage Two
Laps: 115

Final Stage Results

Stage Three
Laps: 122

Race statistics
 Lead changes: 18 among 7 different drivers
 Cautions/Laps: 9 for 51
 Red flags: 0
 Time of race: 3 hours, 6 minutes and 33 seconds
 Average speed:

Media

Television
NBC Sports covered the race on the television side. Rick Allen, two–time Phoenix winner Jeff Burton, Steve Letarte and three-time Phoenix winner Dale Earnhardt Jr. called the race from the broadcast booth. Dave Burns, Parker Kligerman, Marty Snider and Kelli Stavast handled the pit road duties from pit lane. Rutledge Wood handled the features from the track.

Radio
MRN covered the radio call for the race, which was also be simulcast on Sirius XM NASCAR Radio. Alex Hayden, Jeff Striegle and Rusty Wallace called the action from the broadcast booth when the field races down the front straightaway. Dave Moody called the action from turns 1 & 2 and Mike Bagley called the action from turns 3 & 4. Steve Post and Kim Coon covered the action for MRN from pit lane.

Standings after the race

Drivers' Championship standings

Manufacturers' Championship standings

Note: Only the first 16 positions are included for the driver standings.

References

2021 in sports in Arizona
NASCAR Cup Series Championship Race
NASCAR races at Phoenix Raceway
NASCAR Cup Series Championship Race